Gregor Pötscher (born March 26, 1973 in Graz) is a retired Austrian football player.

References

1973 births
Living people
Austrian footballers
Austrian football managers
Grazer AK players
Austrian Football Bundesliga players
Grazer AK managers
DSV Leoben managers
Association football defenders